Dança dos Famosos 1, known at the time as Dança dos Famosos was the debut season of the Brazilian version of the international reality franchise Strictly Come Dancing, which premiered November 20, 2005 and ended December 18, 2005 on the Rede Globo television network. Six celebrities were paired with six professional ballroom dancers. Faustão and Adriana Colin were the hosts for this season.

Actress and model Karina Bacchi won the competition over actor Alexandre Barillari.

Couples

Elimination chart

Weekly results

Week 1
Style: Salsa
Aired: November 20, 2005

Week 2
Style: Bolero
Aired: November 27, 2005

Week 3
Style: Lambada
Aired: December 4, 2005

Week 4
Style: Samba
Aired: December 11, 2005

Week 5
Style: Waltz, Pasodoble & Tango
Aired: December 18, 2005

References

External links
 Official Site 

Season 01
2005 Brazilian television seasons

pt:Dança dos Famosos